Brake cleaner, often also called parts cleaner, is a mostly colorless cleaning agent, mainly used for cleaning the brake disks, the engine compartment and underfloor of motor vehicles. An important feature is that the brake cleaner leaves no residue after the solvents evaporate.

Composition 
Chlorinated brake cleaners (often sold as non-flammable) use organochlorides like tetrachloroethylene and dichloromethane. Historically 1,1,1-Trichloroethane was used, sometimes together with Tetrachloroethylene. It was phased out due to its ozone-depleting nature.

Non-chlorinated brake cleaners use hydrocarbons as a main component; it will either be a low-boiling aliphatic compound or higher-boiling hydrocarbon mixture. Aromatics like benzene, toluene or xylene may also be used. The hydrocarbons used are sometimes made by hydrogenation from naphtha. The lipophilic liquids dissolve fat-soluble lubricants or oils. Some products also contain polar solvents such as ethanol, methanol, isopropanol, and acetone in order to dissolve non-lipophilic substances. Many formulations are incompatible with various materials, especially plastics.

Use 
The main application of brake cleaners is the degreasing and cleaning metal parts or metallic surfaces. They are used for removing oils, fats, resins, tar and dust, mainly in the automotive sector.

About 10 million liters are consumed per year in Germany.

Danger 
Brake cleaners contain toxic compounds and should only be used in well-ventilated areas or outdoors. Some are highly flammable and harmful for environment, which also has to be considered during storage. Skin exposure to the solvent mixture may cause irritation and defatting injury.

Chlorinated brake cleaner containing tetrachloroethylene will, on exposure to high temperatures (above ) or strong UV light, decompose into phosgene and hydrogen chloride, both of which are extremely dangerous if inhaled.

Rubber and some types of plastics are decomposed by brake cleaners by removing binding components. This has the consequence that the rubber will appear unchanged at first; however, it will become brittle, and after a few weeks to months cracks and fractures appear.

Alternatives 
For frequent and industrial use, cleaning and degreasing may be an alternative to supercritical carbon dioxide or dry Ice blasting, which is abrasive. This requires a setup to apply the carbon dioxide. While the harmful vapors are eliminated, the CO2 must be ventilated. Applying the carbon dioxide causes electrostatic discharge by the expanding gas. The dust and harmful brake dust is not bound in the liquid.

References 

Cleaning products
Vehicle braking technologies
Pages with unreviewed translations